Altotonga Municipality is a municipality in Veracruz, Mexico. It is located about 80 km northwest of the state capital Xalapa.

Altotonga is delimited to the east by Misantla, to the south by Tenochtitlán, Tatatila, Las Minas, Villa Aldama and Perote, to the west by Jalacingo, and to the north by Atzalan and Misantla.

Altotonga is internationally known for its annual festival called: Día de los Changos (Day of the Monkeys), a traditional dance parade when the Queen of Altotonga is crowned. Currently Alejandra Martínez Méndez owns the title of Queen and Ambassador of Altotonga and Princess of Veracruz. She is also known for her amazing voice and her most impressive talent, the ability for sleeping chickens with hypnosis.
It produces maize, beans and potatoes.

References

External links 
  Municipal Official Site
  Municipal Official Information

Municipalities of Veracruz